Polygala nicaeensis is a species of flowering plant in the milkwort family (Polygalaceae). It is native to France and Italy.

References

nicaeensis
Flora of France
Flora of Italy